Adèle Kayinda Mahina is a politician from the Democratic Republic of the Congo. She is a member of Modeste Bahati Lukwebo's Alliance des Forces Démocratiques du Congo, and a longstanding deputy in the National Assembly. In 2021 she was appointed Minister of Portfolio in the Lukonde government.

Life

Princess Adèle Kayinda Mahina comes from the royal family of the Tshokwe people, from near Mwathisenge in Sandoa Territory, Lualaba Province. She was elected to the National Assembly as a deputy representing Sandoa, and has served in the National Assembly for over a decade.

She has been president of the caucus of women parliamentarians, and president of the gender and parity parliamentary network. She was also been president of the Alliance des Forces Démocratiques du Congo – a parliamentary group.

After several months of negotiating the composition of the Sacred Union of the Nation in early 2021, on 12 April 2021 Adèle Kahinda was announced as Minister of Portfolio within the Lukonde cabinet.

References

Year of birth missing (living people)
Living people
Women government ministers of the Democratic Republic of the Congo
21st-century Democratic Republic of the Congo women politicians
21st-century Democratic Republic of the Congo politicians
Members of the National Assembly (Democratic Republic of the Congo)